The Welsh Rugby Union Division Three East (also called the SWALEC Division Three East for sponsorship reasons) is a rugby union league in Wales.

Competition format and sponsorship

Competition
There are 12 clubs in the WRU Division Three East. During the course of a season (which lasts from September to May) each club plays the others twice, once at their home ground and once at that of their opponents for a total of 22 games for each club, with a total of 132 games in each season. Teams receive four points for a win and two point for a draw, an additional bonus point is awarded to either team if they score four tries or more in a single match. No points are awarded for a loss though the losing team can gain a bonus point for finishing the match within seven points of the winning team.  Teams are ranked by total points, then the number of tries scored and then points difference. At the end of each season, the club with the most points is crowned as champion. If points are equal the tries scored then points difference determines the winner. The team who is declared champion at the end of the season is eligible for promotion to the WRU Division Two East. The two lowest placed teams are relegated into the WRU Division Four East.

Sponsorship 
In 2008 the Welsh Rugby Union announced a new sponsorship deal for the club rugby leagues with SWALEC valued at £1 million (GBP). The initial three year sponsorship was extended at the end of the 2010/11 season, making SWALEC the league sponsors until 2015. The leagues sponsored are the WRU Divisions one through to seven.

 (2002-2005) Lloyds TSB
 (2005-2008) Asda
 (2008-2015) SWALEC

2011/2012 season

League teams
 Abergavenny RFC
 Abertillery RFC
 Brynmawr RFC
 Caerphilly RFC
 Croesyceiliog RFC
 Garndiffaith RFC
 Newport HSOB RFC
 Pill Harriers RFC
 Pontypool United RFC
 Risca RFC
 Senghenydd RFC
 Tredegar Ironsides RFC

2011/2012 Table

2010/2011 season

League teams
 Abergavenny RFC
 Abertillery RFC
 Blaina RFC
 Croesyceiliog RFC
 Garndiffaith RFC
 Newport HSOB RFC
 Newport Saracens RFC
 Pill Harriers RFC
 Pontypool United RFC
 Rhymney RFC
 Risca RFC
 Tredegar Ironsides RFC

2010/2011 Table

2009/2010 season

League teams
 Abergavenny RFC
 Blaina RFC
 Croesyceiliog RFC
 Cwmbran RFC
 Fleur De Lys RFC
 Gwernyfed RFC
 Nelson RFC
 Newport HSOB RFC
 Pill Harriers RFC
 Pontypool United RFC
 Rhymney RFC
 Tredegar Ironsides RFC

2009/2010 Table

2008/2009 season

League teams
 Abertillery RFC
 Blaina RFC
 Croesyceiliog RFC
 Cwmbran RFC
 Garndiffaith RFC
 Gwernyfed RFC
 Nelson RFC
 New Tredegar RFC
 Newport HSOB RFC
 Pill Harriers RFC
 Pontypool United RFC
 Rhymney RFC

2008/2009 Table

2007/2008 season

League teams
 Abergavenny RFC
 Blaina RFC
 Brynmawr RFC
 Croesyceiliog RFC
 Cwmbran RFC
 Garndiffaith RFC
 Nelson RFC
 New Tredegar RFC
 Pontllanfraith RFC
 Pontypool United RFC
 Rhymney RFC
 Senghenydd RFC

2007/2008 Table

2006/2007 season

League teams
 Abergavenny RFC
 Blaina RFC
 Brynmawr RFC
 Cwmbran RFC
 Nelson RFC
 New Tredegar RFC
 Newport High School Old Boys RFC
 Penallta RFC
 Pontllanfraith RFC
 Pontypool United RFC
 Rhymney RFC
 Senghenydd RFC

2006/2007 Table

References

5